Nəmirli (also, Mamirly, Namerli, Namirly, and Nemirli) is a village and municipality in the Agsu Rayon of Azerbaijan.  It has a population of 445.

References 

Populated places in Agsu District